Vadodara railway division is one of the six railway divisions under Western Railway zone of Indian Railways. This railway division was formed on 1 April 1952 and its headquarter is located at Vadodara in the state of Gujarat of India.

Mumbai WR railway division, Ahmedabad railway division, Bhavnagar railway division, Rajkot railway division   and Ratlam railway division are the other five railway divisions under WR Zone headquartered at  Churchgate, Mumbai.

List of railway stations and towns 
The list includes the stations  under the Vadodara railway division and their station category.

Stations closed for Passengers -

References

 
Divisions of Indian Railways
1952 establishments in Bombay State

Transport in Vadodara